was a Japanese translator, essayist, non-fiction writer, novelist, and simultaneous interpreter between Russian and Japanese, best known in Japan for simultaneous interpretation in 1980s and 1990s and writing in 2000s.

Biography
Yonehara was born in Tokyo. Her father Itaru was a member of the Japan Communist Party and had a seat in the lower house of the Japanese Diet representing Tottori Prefecture, and her grandfather, Yonehara Shōzō, was President of Tottori Prefecture Assembly, and a member of the House of Peers.

In 1959, Itaru was sent to Prague, Czechoslovakia as an editor of The Problems on Peace and Socialism, an international communist party magazine and his family accompanied him. Mari initially studied the Czech language, but her father placed her in an international school run by the Soviet Union, where education was conducted in Russian language so that his children were able to continue the language in Japan. The school curriculum was heavy on communist indoctrination, and Yonehara's classmates included children from over 50 countries.

Yonehara returned to Japan in 1964, and after graduation from high school, attended the Tokyo University of Foreign Studies, majoring in the Russian language. She also joined the Japan Communist Party. She then attended a postgraduate program at the University of Tokyo, where she received master in Russian literature and Russian culture. After she left the university, she taught Russian at the Soviet Gakuin (present day Tokyo Russian Language Institute) and the Bunka Gakuin's "university division", while working as an interpreter and translator part-time.
She was the president of the Association 1995-1997 and 2003-2006 until her death.

With the demise and the collapse of the Soviet Union, her services were much in demand by the news agencies, television and also by the Japanese government, and she was also requested to assist during the visit of Russian President Boris Yeltsin to Japan in 1990.

From April 1997 to March 1998, she appeared on the public broadcaster NHK's Russian language educational program.

() about the search for her classmates at Prague after the collapse of the Soviet Bloc.

From 2003, she was a regular commentator on TBS television's Saturday evening news show, . She never married.

Nicknames
Her nicknames in her own essays: (all these come from Japanese feeble jokes ->) "La Dame Aux Camelias" (in Japanese [tsubaki hime] means both "lady of camelias" and "lady of saliva" ; for she was capable to take dry sandwiches at once with no drink), and, "The Tongue Slipping Beauty" (in Japanese [zekka bijin] ; for she had a cynical view, and [zekka] is close to the sound , Epiphyllum oxypetalum. [bijin] means "the beauty")
 
She was also an active member and official of the Japan PEN.

Death
She died of ovarian cancer at her home in Kamakura, Kanagawa, aged 56.

References

1950 births
2006 deaths
People from Tokyo
University of Tokyo alumni
Japanese communists
Deaths from ovarian cancer
Deaths from cancer in Japan
Communist women writers
20th-century Japanese translators
20th-century Japanese women writers
20th-century Japanese writers